Judith Vivienne Blake, Baroness Blake of Leeds  (born 23 July 1953, née Parsons) is a British Labour politician serving as a life peer in the House of Lords since 2021. She serves on the opposition front bench as a Shadow Spokesperson for Housing, Communities and Local Government and an Opposition Whip.

Blake served as the leader of Leeds City Council from 2015 to 2021, becoming the first woman to hold the position.

Personal life
Blake was born on 23 July 1953 into a Methodist family in Leeds. Both of her parents were doctors. She attended Leeds Girls High School until 1971 and then studied History at the University of Kent.

After university, she began her career in education and social policy, living in London and then Birmingham in the 1980s. She taught English to refugees whilst living in Birmingham. In 1992, she returned to live in Otley.

Blake has four children. Her youngest child, Olivia Blake was elected as the Member of Parliament for Sheffield Hallam in 2019.

Political career
Blake was elected as an Otley town councillor, and, except for a two-year gap after losing her seat in Weetwood at the 2000 city council election, has been an elected member of Leeds City Council since 1996.

She has twice contested the Leeds North West constituency in 2005 and 2010 as the Labour Party's prospective parliamentary candidate, losing on both occasions to Greg Mulholland.

Following her selection as deputy leader of the Leeds Labour group in 2003, once the party regained control of Leeds in 2010, Blake served as the Deputy Leader of the Council for five years to 2015. She was the Executive Cabinet Member for Children & Families during this period, overseeing the city's Children's Services' Ofsted rating change from "inadequate" to "good overall". She has been involved in a number of national legal campaigns, worked with education authorities in Yorkshire to raise school standards in the area, and worked on crises and issues with student grades and school placements throughout her career.

She voted for Yvette Cooper in the 2015 Labour Party leadership election and supported Keir Starmer in the 2020 leadership election.

Leader of Leeds City Council

Following the stepping down of then-leader Keith Wakefield, Blake was elected as the first woman leader of Leeds City Council in May 2015. She chaired the Council's Executive Board, having also served on the boards for NHS Leeds and the West Yorkshire Police Authority. In April 2019, Blake was appointed to the board of Northern Ballet.

In December 2015, she expressed the frustration of city residents in feeling that Prime Minister David Cameron was giving greater attention to more affluent southern counties during a period of severe flooding.

She was awarded a Commander of the Order of the British Empire (CBE) in the 2017 Birthday Honours.

House of Lords 
In December 2020, it was announced Blake would be conferred a Life Peerage after a nomination by Labour Party Leader Keir Starmer. In February 2021, she was created Baroness Blake of Leeds, of Gledhow in the City of Leeds.

Blake joined the opposition front bench in May 2021, as a Shadow Spokesperson for Housing, Communities and Local Government and an Opposition Whip.

Electoral history

References

External links
Judith Blake page at Leeds City Council

Living people
Alumni of the University of Kent
Commanders of the Order of the British Empire
Councillors in Leeds
Labour Party (UK) councillors
Labour Party (UK) life peers
People educated at Leeds Girls' High School
Leaders of local authorities of England
1953 births
Life peeresses created by Elizabeth II
Women councillors in England